Anastasiya Nikolayevna Nifontova (born 19 January 1979) is a Russian rally raid motorcycle rider.

Niftontova won the FIM Women's Cross-Country Rallies World Cup in 2015 and 2021. She was the first Russian woman to take part in the Dakar Rally in the motorcycle category, finishing second among female motorcycle racers in the 2017. She became the first woman to finish in this rally-raid in the Original by Motul category, in which the participants compete without technical support.

Nifontova has been married twice and has two children, Maria and Timofey.

References

1979 births
Living people
Russian motorcycle racers
Enduro riders
Racing drivers from Washington, D.C.
Off-road motorcycle racers
Dakar Rally motorcyclists
Female motorcycle racers